Yossi Abulafia (born 1944) is an Israeli writer and illustrator of children's books, as well as a graphic artist, cartoonist, director and screenwriter of animation films.

Biography 
Abulafia was born in Tiberias in 1944 in what was then the British Mandate of Palestine. At age 17, he was accepted to Israel's national school of art "Bezalel Academy of Arts and Design". He graduated from the school after majoring graphic design for 4 years. After his military service Abulafia began to work in the Israeli Channel 1 as graphic artist and cartoonist.

Work
In 1975 Abulafia illustrated the back cover for Kaveret's third album Crowded in the Ear (צפוף באוזן) which was a collage of images illustrating the various songs on the album in the style of the famous Monty Python illustrations done by Terry Gilliam.

Towards the mid-1980s Abulafia moved to North America, where he worked for six years as an animation producer and as a director in both Canada and the United States. During these years Abulafia began to illustrate and write children's books, both for Israelis and for Americans.

In 1990 Abulafia published the children's book HaKina Nechama (Hebrew: Nechama the Head Louse) which was written by Meir Shalev and illustrated by Abulafia. The book, which humorously describes the adventures of a head louse, became very popular and influential in Israel and was adapted to other media numerous times.

In 1999 Abulafia created all the transition animated clips of the 1999 Eurovision song contest held in Israel, which were based on the stories of the Bible.

To date, Abulafia has illustrated more than 140 books (eight of them were written by him), and is widely known for illustrating the children's books written by Ephraim Sidon and Meir Shalev.

Abulafia used to illustrate for the Israeli newspapers Hadashot and Ma'ariv, and served as the head of the animation department at the Bezalel Academy of Arts and Design, which he established together with Hanan Kaminski.

Personal life
Abulafia currently resides in the Israeli settlement of Har Adar, and serves as a senior lecturer in the animation department of the Bezalel Academy of Arts and Design.

Films 
 Canada Vignettes: News Canada
 Friends of the Family
 Ottawa 82 Logo

Notable books illustrated by Yossi Abulafia 
 Am I Beautiful? (by Else Holmelund Minarik)
 Clean House (by Jessie Haas)
 Harry's Pony (by Barbara Ann Porte)
 It's Valentine's Day (by Jack Prelutsky)
 My Parents Think I'm Sleeping (by Jack Prelutsky)
 Moving Day (by Robert Kalan)

References

External links 

 Yossi Abulafia's Homepage
 
 Yossi Abulafia on dafdaf.co.il (Hebrew)
 Yossi Abulafia – on the Am Oved website (Hebrew)
 Yossi Abulafia – brief biography on The Institute for the Translation of Hebrew Literature website (English)
 Yossi Abulafia also knows how to tell a story – article published on Nrg Maariv on May 11, 2009 (Hebrew)
 Interview with Yossi Abulafia – article published on Nrg Maariv on May 13, 2009 (Hebrew)
 Review of Yossi Abulafia's books on simania.co.il (Hebrew)

Hebrew-language writers
Israeli cartoonists
Israeli animators
Israeli animated film directors
Israeli illustrators
20th-century Israeli male writers
21st-century Israeli male writers
Academic staff of Bezalel Academy of Arts and Design
1944 births
Living people
Jewish Israeli writers
Jewish artists
People from Tiberias
Israeli settlers